Yana Uqsha (Quechua yana black, very dark, uqsha (locally), uqsa high altitude grass, hispanicized spelling Yanahojsha) is a mountain in the Andes of Peru, about  high. It is located in the Lima Region, Huaral Province, Andamarca District. It lies southwest of Warunqucha.

References

Mountains of Peru
Mountains of Lima Region